Rahera Te Kahuhiapo ( 1820s – 12 October 1910) was a notable New Zealand tribal leader. Of Māori descent, she identified with the Ngāti Pikiao, Ngāti Pūkenga and Te Arawa iwi. She was born in Motutawa Pā, Rotorua, New Zealand.

Te Kahuhiapo's descendents include Ernie Asher, Ross Dallow, Graeme Dallow, Simon Dallow and Matthew Dallow.

References

1820s births
1910 deaths
Te Arawa people
Ngāti Pūkenga people
Ngāti Pikiao people